The Green Room Awards are peer awards which recognise excellence in cabaret, dance, drama, fringe theatre, musical theatre and opera in Melbourne.

The awards were started in 1982 when Blair Edgar and Steven Tandy formed the Green Room Awards Association. The inaugural awards ceremony was held in 1984 at the Melbourne Concert Hall. The association today is composed of members of Melbourne's performing arts community, including journalists, performers, writers, directors, choreographers, academics, theatre technicians and administrators.

The current patrons of the association are Rachel Griffiths and David Atkins. Previous winners include Dale Ferguson, David Hersey, Stephen Baynes, Greg Horsman, Eddie Perfect, Laurie Cadevida, Stephen Daldry, Genevieve Lemon, Michael Dameski, Julian Gavin, and Steve Mouzakis.

Award categories

As of 2013, award categories include:

Theatre (companies)
Production
Direction
Female actor
Male actor
Ensemble
Set/costume
Lighting
Sound/composition
Writing/adaptation

Theatre (independent)
Production
Direction
Performers (2 awards)
Ensemble
Design
Lighting design
Sound/composition
Writing

Music theatre
Production
Direction
Choreography
Musical direction
Female actor in a leading role
Male actor in a leading role
Female actor in a featured role
Male actor in a featured role
Ensemble
Design – Lighting and/or sound
Design – Set and/or costume

Opera
Production
Conductor
Direction
Principal female
Principal male
Supporting female
Supporting male
Design

Dance
Concept and realisation
Male dancer
Female dancer
Ensemble
Design
Sound and music

Cabaret
Production
Artiste
Musical direction
Writing
Direction

Alternative and hybrid performance
Production

Named awards
Several named awards can be given:
 Lifetime Achievement Award
 made to a person whose outstanding work has had a significant impact in Melbourne.
 Outstanding Technical Achievement Award
 for technical contributions behind the scenes.
 Best New Writing Award
 for an exceptional new script or production.
 Betty Pounder Award for Original Choreography
in memory of choreographer Betty Pounder whose work encompassed all dance genres and their inclusion in plays and opera, is given for choreographic work in any area.

Recipients 
Recipients for the Production award in each category include the following, with the year relating to the year of the award ceremony:

Theatre companies 
1987: Away (Playbox)
1988: A Day in the Death of Joe Egg (Melbourne Theatre Company)
1990: Dreams In An Empty City (Melbourne Theatre Company)
1991: In Angel Gear (Performing Arts Projects)
1992: The Dybbuk (Gilgul Theatre)
1993: Sex Diary of an Infidel (Playbox)
1994: Angels in America (Melbourne Theatre Company)
1995: Angels in America Part 2 (Perestroika) (Melbourne Theatre Company)
2000-2004: n/a
2005: Twelve Angry Men (Adrian Bohm Presents/Arts Projects Australia)
2006:
2007: Harvest (Red Stitch Actors Theatre)
2008: The Tell-Tale Heart (Malthouse Theatre / Melbourne International Arts Festival)
2009: The Season at Sarsaparilla (Sydney Theatre Company / Melbourne Theatre Company)
2010: When the Rain Stops Falling (Brink Productions/Melbourne Theatre Company in association with Melbourne International Arts Festival)
2011: Thyestes (Malthouse Theatre / The Hayloft Project)
2012: Ganesh Versus the Third Reich (Back to Back Theatre / Malthouse Theatre / Melbourne Festival)
2013: Top Girls (Melbourne Theatre Company)
2014: The Bloody Chamber (Malthouse Theatre)
2015: Henry V (Bell Shakespeare)
2016: I Am a Miracle (Malthouse Theatre)
2017: Miss Julie (Melbourne Theatre Company)
2018: The Season (Tasmania Performs)
2019: The Bleeding Tree (Griffin Theatre Company presented by Arts Centre Melbourne)
2020: Barbara and the Camp Dogs (Belvoir in association with Vicki Gordon Music Productions presented by Malthouse Theatre)
2021: n/a
2022: Iphigenia in Splott (Red Stitch)

Independent theatre 
1997: Verona (Magpie Theatre)
1998: Sunrise Boulevard (Rod Quantock presented by Token Productions)
1999: Who’s Afraid of the Working Class (Melbourne Workers Theatre at Trades Hall)
2000: The Terms and Grammar of Creation (Sue Gore & Bill Garner)
2001: A Large Attendance in the Antechamber (Brian Lipson/Wendy Lasica and Associates)
2002: My Brother the Fish (Dan Scollay)
2003: The Grand Feeling (Paradigm Productions)
2004: The Black Swan of Trespass
2005: The Candy Butchers; The Eistedfodd
2006: The Laramie Project
2007: For Samuel Beckett (The Eleventh Hour Theatre)
2008: Holiday (Ranters Theatre)
2009: Oedipus, A Poetic Requiem (Inspired By Ted Hughes) (Liminal Theatre, Mary Sitarenos)
2010: Alice in Wonderland (Four Larks Theatre)
2011: Us (Grit Theatre / The Function Room)
2012: Save for Crying (doubletap / La Mama)
2013: Persona (Fraught Outfit and Theatre Works)
2014: The Sovereign Wife (Sisters Grimm/NEON)
2015: The Trouble With Harry (MKA, Darebin Arts Speakeasy and Melbourne Festival)
2016: SHIT (Dee & Cornelius as part of Neon Festival for Independent Theatre)
2017: Blood on the Dance Floor (Ilbijerri Theatre Company and Jacob Boehme)
2018: Song For A Weary Throat (Rawcus in association with Theatre Works)
2019: Apokalypsis (The Substation in association with Next Wave)
2020: Mr Burns: A Post-Electric Play (Lightning Jar Theatre in association with fortyfivedownstairs)
2021: 落叶归根 (Luò yè guīgēn) Getting Home (Cheryl Ho & Rachel Lee as part of Melbourne Fringe)
2022: Kerosene (Jack Dixon-Gunn in association with Theatre Works) and The Gospel According to Jesus Queen of Heaven (Ben Anderson Presents in association with Theatre Works) [in-person]; Juniper Wilde: Wilde Night In (The Social Validation Club as part of Melbourne Fringe) [digital]

Music theatre 
1987: Guys and Dolls (Adelaide Festival Centre Trust)
1990: Anything Goes (Hayden Attractions, Victoria State Opera & Bill Armstrong)
1991: Les Miserables (Cameron Mackintosh)
1992: The Phantom of the Opera (Cameron Mackintosh, Really Useful Productions)
1993: The King and I (Victorian Arts Centre/Victoria State Opera/Gordon Frost/Adelaide Festival Centre Trust)
1994: Hot Shoe Shuffle (David Atkins Enterprises)
1995: West Side Story (Victoria State Opera, International Management Group)
2000: The Boy From Oz (Ben Gannon and Robert Fox)
2001-2007: n/a
2008: Priscilla Queen of the Desert The Musical
2009: Billy Elliot The Musical (Universal Pictures Stage Entertainment, Working Title Films, Old Vic Productions)
2010: Jersey Boys (Dodger Theatricals, Newtheatricals, Dainty Consolidated Entertainment and Michael Watt)
2011: Mary Poppins
2012: n/a
2013: Chess (The Production Company)
2014: n/a
2015: Once (Barbara Broccoli, John N. Hart Jr, Patrick Milling Smith, Frederick Zollo, Brian Carmody, Michael G. Wilson, Orin Wolf, John Frost, New York Theatre Workshop, Melbourne Theatre Company)
2016: Strictly Ballroom (Global Creatures and Bazmark)
2017: Matilda the Musical (The Royal Shakespeare Company and Louise Withers, Michael Coppel and Michael Watt)
2018: Aladdin The Musical (Disney Theatrical Productions)
2019: Beautiful: The Carole King Musical (Michael Cassel Group)
2020: Come From Away (Junkyard Dog Productions and Rodney Rigby)
2021: n/a
2022: The Wedding Singer (David Venn Enterprises)

Opera 
1987: Madam Butterfly (Victoria State Opera)
1990: The Turn of the Screw (Australian Opera)
1991: Faust (Victoria State Opera)
1992: Elektra (Victoria State Opera/Melbourne International Festival of the Arts)
1993: The Tales of Hoffmann (Victoria State Opera)
1994: Hansel and Gretel (Australian Opera)
1995: A Midsummer Night’s Dream (Australian Opera)
2000: Billy Budd (Opera Australia)
2001: Capriccio (Opera Australia)
2002: Batavia (Opera Australia)
2003: Sweeney Todd (Opera Australia)
2004: Lulu (Opera Australia)
2005: Manon (Opera Australia)
2006: The Love for Three Oranges (Opera Australia)
2007: The Hive (ChamberMade Opera)
2008: Rusalka (Opera Australia)
2009: Arabella (Opera Australia); The Coronation of Poppea (Victorian Opera)
2010: Lady Macbeth of Mtsensk (Opera Australia)
2011: La Sonnambula (Opera Australia)
2012: Of Mice and Men (Opera Australia)
2013: Salome (Opera Australia)
2014: Nixon in China (Victorian Opera)
2015: Eugene Onegin (Opera Australia)
2016: Le nozze di Figaro (Opera Australia)
2017: The Ring Cycle (Opera Australia)
2018: King Roger (Opera Australia)
2019: Die Meistersinger (Opera Australia)
2020: Il Viaggio a Reims (Opera Australia)
2021: n/a
2022: Das Rheingold (Melbourne Opera)

Cabaret 
2000: Saucy Cantina (Moira Finucane and Jackie Smith)
2001: Jacques Brel Is Alive & Well & Living In Paris (Mark Jones, Susan-ann Walker, Sean Murphy, Anne Wood)
2002: Cabaret Tingel Tangel (The Soubrettes)
2003: Terra Paradiso
2004: Comedy Is Still Not Pretty
2005: The Burlesque Hour
2006:
2007: Tim Minchin (Tim Minchin)
2008: Meow Meow Beyond Beyond Glamour: The Remix (Meow Meow)
2009: Die Roten Punkte – Super Musikant
2010: Songs from the 86 Tram – The Bedroom Philosopher (City of Melbourne and Nan & Pop Records)
2011: Yana Alana and tha Paranas in Concert (Gasworks & Arts Victoria in association with Melbourne Workers Theatre and Yana Alana and tha Paranas)
2012: Little Match Girl (Malthouse Theatre in association with Meow Meow Revolution)
2013: Nasty! – Spanky (Candice McQueen)
2014: Between The Cracks (Yana Alana)
2015: Eurosmash (Die Roten Punkte)
2016: Briefs
2017: Hot Brown Honey (Darebin Arts Speakeasy and Briefs Factory)
2018: Yummy (Yummy, Melba Spiegeltent as part of Melbourne International Comedy Festival)
2019: Reuben Kaye (Reuben Kaye)
2020: Boobs (Selina Jenkins as part of Melbourne Fringe)
2021: Lousical the Musical (Lou Wall as part of Melbourne Fringe)
2022: Reuben Kaye: The Butch is Back (Pietagogetter as part of Melbourne International Comedy Festival)

Dance 
1987: After Venice (Sydney Dance Company)
1989: Vast
1990: Onegin (The Australian Ballet)
1991: The Leaves Are Falling (The Australian Ballet)
1992: Gemini (The Australian Ballet); No Strings Attached (DanceWorks)
1993: Nutcracker (The Australian Ballet)
1994: Nuti / Kikimora (Meryl Tankard Australian Dance Theatre)
1995: Divergence (The Australian Ballet)
2002: Tivoli (Sydney Dance Company & The Australian Ballet)
2003: Swan Lake (The Australian Ballet); Walkabout (Bangarra Dance Theatre)
2019: Overture (Arts House and Jo Lloyd)
2020: plenty serious Talk Talk (Vicki Van Hout in association with Arts House and Yirramboi Festival)
2021: n/a
2022: I am Maggie (Jonathan Homsey as part of Arts Centre Melbourne Take Over for Melbourne Fringe 2020)

Contemporary and experimental performance 
2017: Complete Smut Art Auction (Punctum)
2018: We All Know What’s Happening (Samara Hersch & Lara Thoms)
2019: Crackers n Dip with Chase n Toey (Carly Sheppard & Josh Twee presented by Arts House)
2020: Daddy (Joel Bray presented by Arts House and Yirramboi Festival); Diaspora (A Chamber Made work by Robin Fox and Collaborators in association with Melbourne International Arts Festival and The Substation); Those Who Rock (Joseph O'Farrell presented by Arts Centre Melbourne)
2021: n/a

Lifetime Achievement Award 
Recipients include (year added where found):
John Sumner (1985)
Dame Peggy van Praagh
Irene Mitchell
Betty Pounder, choreographer, arts administrator
Edna Edgley (1989)
Dame Joan Hammond (1988)
Ray Powell (ballet) helped found the Australian Ballet
John McCallum (1990)
Noel Pelly (1992)
John Truscott (1993)
Alfred Ruskin (1994)
Anne Fraser (designer) (1995)
Patricia Kennedy (1996)
Dame Margaret Scott (1998) first director of the Australian Ballet School, founded 1964

See also
Performing arts of Australia

References

External links
 
 </ref>

 
Awards established in 1982
Australian theatre awards
Performing arts in Melbourne
1982 establishments in Australia